Arum italicum subsp. canariense is a flowering plant subspecies in the family Araceae.

Description
Arum italicum subsp. canariense differs from other subspecies in having spathe tubes that are purple on the interior, staminodes in 2 or 3 whorls (versus 4 or 5 in other subspecies), and petioles and peduncles that are dull purple instead of green. Leaves and inflorescences of Madeiran plants are also reportedly larger than continental plants.

Habitat
It grows in clearings in Laurus forests in Madeira, the Canary Islands, and the Azores.

Taxonomy
It was described in 1848 as an independent species, Arum canariense. Within the genus Arum, it belongs to subgenus Arum, and section Arum. A recent molecular study found that this island subspecies is well-differentiated from its mainland relatives, although its specific status and relationship with the mainland Arum italicum and with Arum concinnatum are unclear.

References

italicum subsp. canariense